Geometridites is an extinct genus of moths in the family Geometridae. The genus was erected by Clark et al. in 1971.

Species
†Geometridites jordani Kernbach, 1967 (Willershausen, Pliocene)
†Geometridites larentiiformis Jarzembowski, 1980
†Geometridites repens Kernbach, 1967

References

Geometridae